The Harder They Fall may refer to:

 The Harder They Fall (1956 film), an American boxing film noir directed by Mark Robson.
 The Harder They Fall (2021 film), an American Western film directed by Jeymes Samuel.
 "The Harder They Fall", a song on the 1968 Phil Ochs album Tape From California
 "The Harder They Fall" (Porridge), a 1975 television episode
 "The Harder They Fall" (Magic City), a 2012 television episode

See also 
 
 The Harder They Come (disambiguation)